The Workshop on Software Engineering for Adaptive and Self-Managing Systems (SEAMS) is an academic conference for exchanging research results and experiences in the areas of autonomic computing, self-managing, self-healing, self-optimizing, self-configuring, and self-adaptive systems theory. 
It was established in 2006 at the International Conference on Software Engineering (ICSE).
It integrated workshops held mainly at ICSE and the Foundations of Software Engineering (FSE) conference since 2002, including the FSE 2002 and 2004 Workshops on Self-Healing (Self-Managed) Systems (WOSS), ICSE 2005 Workshop on Design and Evolution of Autonomic Application Software, and the ICSE 2002, 2003, 2004 and 2005 Workshops on Architecting Dependable Systems.

References

External links
 ICSE 2012 SEAMS
 ICSE 2011 SEAMS
 ICSE 2010 SEAMS
 ICSE 2009 SEAMS
 ICSE 2008 SEAMS
 ICSE 2007 SEAMS
 ICSE 2006 SEAMS
 SEAMS 2007 Organizer Information
 IEEE International Conference on Autonomic Computing (ICAC)

Software engineering conferences